The saddleback gunnel (Pholis ornata), also known as the saddled blenny, is a species of marine ray-finned fish belonging to the family Pholidae, the gunnels. This fish occurs in the shallow coastal waters of the eastern North Pacific Ocean.

Taxonomy
The saddleback gunnel was first formally described as Gunnellus ornatus in 1854 by the French biologist Charles Frédéric Girard with the type locality given as Presidio, San Francisco, California. The specific name ornata means "decorated" or "adorned", assumed to be an allusion to the 12-13 blackish-brown saddle markings on back, as well as the light and dark streaks which radiate outwards from the eyes.

Description 
The saddleback gunnel has between 74 and 79 spines in its dorsal fin and 2 spines and 35 to 38 soft rays in its anal fin. The caudal fin is rounded and it has tiny pelvic fin. There are 12 or 13 blackish-brown saddle markings along the back and light and dark streaks which radiate outwards from the eyes.

Distribution and habitat 
The saddleback gunnel ranges from Vancouver Island in the north to Santa Barbara County, California in the south. It is found at depths of  along the coast and in estuaries where it is found on muddy substrates among seaweeds and seagrass. They are rarely seen by divers because they spend most of the day in structures and are flighty, even at night.

Biology 
Saddleback gunnels on small crustaceans and molluscs. After spawning both the males and females guard the egg mass.

References 

Saddleback gunnel
Taxa named by Charles Frédéric Girard
Fish described in 1854